Holly Lodge High School College of Science is a secondary school located in Smethwick, West Midlands, England.

Admissions
It is located on Holly Lane on the middle point between Smethwick and Oldbury, near West Smethwick Park and West Park Road less than a mile from the M5. There are also entrances on Marshall Street and Forster Street. The school has a large percentage (65%) of pupils from Sikh, Hindu and Islamic communities. 23% of the school population are white.

The school was expanded in September 1992 when it took in the pupils of Smethwick Hall Boys School, which had closed at the end of the school year that July.

The current headteacher is Mr I Iqbal. Between September 2009 and August 2011, extensive refurbishment of existing facilities and the construction of new buildings occurred on the site as part of the Building Schools for the Future programme. A total of £23 million was spent on improving the facilities.

History
It was originally a girls' and boys' grammar school. The girls' grammar school at Holly Lodge, formerly the home of the Downing family, opened in 1922, moving to a new building in 1927. The boys' grammar school opened in Holly Lodge, moving to a new building opposite the girls' school in 1932. A more detailed background to these early years can be found in The birth of an industrial grammar school:a study of the origins and early development of the Holly Lodge Grammar Schools in Smethwick (available in the Community History Reserve Collection at Sandwell Libraries). In 1940 the school was evacuated to avoid possible bombing.  It settled in Newport Shropshire, sharing Adams Grammar School:
AGS in the mornings and Holly Lodge in the afternoons.

In 1967, the boys' school was joined with James Watt Technical School (a boys' school) on Crockett's Lane. The girls' and boys' schools were united in 1974 as a high school admitting children of all abilities on the two original sites. A Science and Technology block was built in 1970 prior to the amalgamation of the boys' and girls' schools. For a number of years, a co-educational high school was run on the premises that had once been the girls' grammar school, while the former boys' grammar school premises housed West Park Sixth Form College, which closed in 1992. In September 1992, the modern Holly Lodge officially began when three schools in West Smethwick merged. The school has been rebuilt following the Building Schools for the Future programme.

Holly Lodge became a specialist College of Science in the summer of 2004.

In 2010 the school received a lot of press coverage due to the remodelling and refurbishing of the building which was provided by BSF 'Building Schools for the Future' and also received attention when Atlantic R&B Singer Lloyd Polite visited during one of the yearly talent shows where he had a session with a year 11 group giving them tips and advice for the music industry.

There is still an active Holly Lodge Grammar & James Watt Technical School Old Boys Association and a separate Holly Lodge Old Girls Association.

Academic performance
In 2009, 27% of students gained five GCSEs at grades A* – C including English and mathematics. This was, however, a 12% improvement on 2008 results. The science specialism is working exceptionally well with 65% of the students gaining grades A* to C. This is above the national average. This was acknowledged by Ofsted in June 2010.
The school has gone from strength to strength, in the summer examinations in 2010; 39% of the students gained five A*-C grades including English and mathematics. This rose again in 2011; to 50% gaining 5x A*-C grades including English and mathematics.
The school went through another Ofsted inspection in May 2013. The leadership of Ahson Mohammed was having an impact as each category was judged as 'good' with exemplary practice in developing literacy. The school has therefore moved from National Challenge to a good school in four years.

Alumni

Holly Lodge Grammar School
 Adrian Coles OBE, Director General of the Building Societies Association since 1993
 Robin Corbett, Baron Corbett of Castle Vale (1933–2012), Labour MP for Hemel Hempstead from 1974–9, and Birmingham Erdington from 1983 to 2001
 Philip Davis, Leader (Labour) of Telford & Wrekin Council from 2000–4
Julian Dawes, Musician – Composer 
Sam Egginton (Boxer)
 Christine Anne Perfect, known by her stage name Christine McVie, singer songwriter in Fleetwood Mac
 Alan Jones CVO OBE, managing director of TNT UK and CEO TNT Express from 1984 to 2003, CEO Global Solutions Limited 2005– 2008. 
 Dame Julie Walters, DBE actress and author
 Len Webster, author 
 Alexia Gardner, jazz singer
Gregory Evans, dramatist

References

Walters, J. (2008) That's Another Story: the autobiography Chapter 7 'I thought you'd failed', London: Weidenfeld & Nicolson

Webster, L. (1973) The birth of an industrial grammar school: a study of the origins and early development of the Holly Lodge Grammar Schools in Smethwick In the Community History Reserve Collection, Sandwell Libraries.

External links
 Sandwell BSF
 EduBase

Secondary schools in Sandwell
Educational institutions established in 1922
1922 establishments in England
Smethwick
Foundation schools in Sandwell